Scopula dargei is a moth of the family Geometridae. It was described by Claude Herbulot in 1992. It is endemic to Cameroon.

References

Endemic fauna of Cameroon
Moths described in 1992
dargei
Moths of Africa
Taxa named by Claude Herbulot